Deux Mamelles, Collines des Mamelles, or simply Mamelles are twin hills located in Ouakam, a suburban commune of Dakar, in the Cap-Vert peninsula, Senegal.

These hills are of volcanic origin and they are the vestiges of a plateau from the early Quaternary. The name of these breast-shaped hills comes from the French term “Mamelle”, a name commonly applied in the French-speaking parts of the world to a breast.

On the seaward hill stands a lighthouse, the Phare des Mamelles, while on the hill further ashore the African Renaissance Monument was erected and unveiled in 2010.

See also
African Renaissance Monument
Breast-shaped hill
Cap-Vert (volcano)

References

External links
 The Guardian - Senegalese president unveils £17m African Renaissance statue

Dakar
Hills of Africa
Landforms of Senegal